Extensional viscosity  (also known as elongational viscosity) is a viscosity coefficient when applied stress is extensional stress. It is often used for characterizing polymer solutions.
Extensional viscosity can be measured using rheometers that apply extensional stress. Acoustic rheometer is one example of such devices.

Extensional viscosity is defined as the ratio of the normal stress difference to the rate of strain. For uniaxial extension along direction :

where

 is the extensional viscosity or elongational viscosity
 is the normal stress along direction n.
 is the rate of strain: 

The ratio between the extensional viscosity  and the  dynamic viscosity  is known as  Trouton's Ratio . For a Newtonian Fluid, the Trouton ratio equals three.

See also
Rheology

References

Fluid dynamics
Viscosity